How to Be a Bawse: A Guide to Conquering Life is a book by YouTube personality Lilly Singh released on March 28, 2017.

Her book is a New York Times bestseller. A successor book, titled Be A Triangle was released on April 5, 2022.

Release 
In March 2017, Singh announced via YouTube that she would embark on a worldwide book tour called #BawseBook Tour. The tour revolved around her book and it's key concepts. The tour began in New York City in March and concluded in Singapore in May 2017.

Awards and nominations

See also
 A Trip to Unicorn Island

References

2017 non-fiction books
Canadian autobiographies
Comedy books
Books by YouTubers
Debut books
Canadian memoirs
Doubleday (publisher) books
Ballantine Books books